Mauritius competed in the 2003 All-Africa Games held at the National Stadium in the city of Abuja, Nigeria. The country competed in sixteen events and won three bronze medals, all in badminton.

Competitors
Mauritius competed in sixteen events, ten for men and six for women.

Medal summary
The team won three bronze medals and were ranked joint thirty-first in the medal table alongside Burkina Faso, Niger and Togo.

Medal table

List of Medalists

Bronze Medal

See also
 Mauritius at the African Games

References

2003 in Mauritian sport
2003
Nations at the 2003 All-Africa Games